Interphalangeal joint may refer to:
Interphalangeal articulations of hand
Interphalangeal articulations of foot